Ludwig Andreas Buchner (23 July 1813, Munich – 23 October 1897, Munich) was a German pharmacologist. His father was pharmacologist Johann Andreas Buchner (1783-1852).

Academic background 
After attending classes in Munich, he continued his education at the Universities of Giessen and Paris. In 1839 he obtained his PhD, followed by his doctorate of medicine in 1842. In 1847 he became an associate professor of physiological and pathological chemistry at Munich, followed by a full professorship of pharmacy and toxicology in 1852.

In 1849 he became a member of the Imperial Bavarian Academy of Sciences in Munich.

Contributions 
From 1852 to 1876 he was editor of the Repertorium für die Pharmacie, a journal founded by his father. In 1872 he published Commentar zur Pharmacopoea Germanica (two volumes with Germanicized text). Also, he is credited with contributing a number of articles to the Allgemeine Deutsche Biographie.

Works
 Commentar zur Pharmacopoea Germanica mit verdeutschendem Texte : für Apotheker, Aerzte und Medicinal-Beamte ; in 2 Bden. Bd. 2,1 . Oldenbourg, München 1878 Digital edition by the University and State Library Düsseldorf
 Commentar zur Pharmacopoea Germanica mit verdeutschendem Texte : für Apotheker, Aerzte und Medicinal-Beamte ; in 2 Bden. Bd. 2,2 . Oldenbourg, München 1884 Digital edition by the University and State Library Düsseldorf

References

German pharmacologists
1813 births
1897 deaths
Academic staff of the Ludwig Maximilian University of Munich
Scientists from Munich
19th-century chemists
19th-century German scientists